Tenebroides is a genus of bark-gnawing beetles in the family Trogossitidae. There are at least 20 described species in Tenebroides.

Species
These 28 species belong to the genus Tenebroides:

 Tenebroides albonotatus Reitter, 1875 g
 Tenebroides americanus Kirby, 1837 g b
 Tenebroides bimaculatus (Melsheimer, 1844) b (two-spotted trogossidid)
 Tenebroides bipustulatus Fabricius, 1801 g
 Tenebroides brunneus Leveille, 1888 g
 Tenebroides carbonarius Leveille, 1888 g
 Tenebroides collaris (Sturm, 1807) g b
 Tenebroides corticalis (Melsheimer, 1844) g b
 Tenebroides crassicornis (Horn, 1862) g b
 Tenebroides floridanus Schaeffer, 1918 g b
 Tenebroides fuscus (Preyssler, 1790) g
 Tenebroides latens (Wollaston, 1862) g
 Tenebroides laticollis (Horn, 1862) g b
 Tenebroides marginatus Palisot de Beauvois, 1811 b
 Tenebroides maroccanus Reitter, 1884 g
 Tenebroides mauritanicus (Linnaeus) i c g b (cadelle beetle)
 Tenebroides nanus (Melsheimer, 1844) b
 Tenebroides obtusus Horn, 1862 b
 Tenebroides occidentalis Fall, 1910 g b
 Tenebroides punctatolineatus (Fairmaire, 1850) g
 Tenebroides punctulata Reitter, 1875 g
 Tenebroides rectus (Wollaston, 1862) g
 Tenebroides rugosipennis (Horn, 1862) b
 Tenebroides semicylindricus Horn, 1862 b
 Tenebroides sinuatus (LeConte, 1861) g
 Tenebroides sonorensis Sharp, 1891 b
 Tenebroides soror (Jacquelin du Val, 1857) b
 Tenebroides transversicollis Jacquelin du Val, 1857 g

Data sources: i = ITIS, c = Catalogue of Life, g = GBIF, b = Bugguide.net

References

Further reading

External links

 

Trogossitidae